Rakkestad Idrettsforening is a Norwegian sports club from Rakkestad, Østfold. It has sections for association football, team handball, floorball, volleyball, track and field, gymnastics, skiing and speed skating.

It was founded on 11 November 1914. Home field is Rakkestad Stadium, and club colors are blue and white.

The men's football team currently plays in the 4. divisjon, the fifth tier of Norwegian football. It last played in the 2. divisjon in 1998, and after that had three spells in the 3. division: 1999, 2001–2005 and 2009–2010. Its best player ever is Bent Skammelsrud.

References

Official site

Football clubs in Norway
Sport in Østfold
Rakkestad
Association football clubs established in 1914
Defunct athletics clubs in Norway
1914 establishments in Norway